The Grenada Boys' Secondary School (GBSS) is a secondary school in the island of Grenada.

Origins
The Grenada Boys’ Secondary School, initially known as the St. George's Grammar School officially, opened on 2 February 1885, at Mrs. Grey's premises in Hospital Street (the present location of First Caribbean International Bank on Church Street) in St. George's, with 10 male students.

In 1910–11 the school was restructured and renamed Grenada Boys’ Secondary School and was relocated to Melville Street at the present site of the Police Barracks.  The new premises was officially opened on September 18, 1911 with an enrolment of 23 students.  In May 1946 the school was relocated to Tanteen to wooden barracks, which previously housed the Windward Island battalion for World War II.  The wooden barracks were destroyed by hurricane Ivan in 2004.  The school experienced severe destruction from two fires in April and June 2005.  The school's auditorium was refurbished, through the sponsorship of Digicel in 2005.  The first phase of the new school was constructed from 2006 to 2008 by the government of Grenada funded by the World Bank. Renovations and Refurbishments have also taken place on the school in 2021.

The GBSS has been mainly a boys’ school but girls have also attended especially for the sixth form (A-level) years.  Girls were admitted into Form I from 1982 during the reign of the Peoples’ Revolutionary Government to 1987, but were phased out by 1991.

The school roll is 835 male students.  The faculty consists of Principal, 50 Teachers and two Counselors. The school can be found on Facebook.

Notable alumni
 Kirani James
 Paul Durae Duncan
 Sir Paul Scoon
 Sir Leo Victor de Gale
 Herbert Blaize
 Sir Nicolas Brathwaite
 Peter David
 K. Dwight Venner
 Kurt Felix
 Lindon Victor
 Corey Ollivierre
 Junior Murray
 Roger Williams
 Vincent Darius
 Rhodan Gordon
 Jacob Ross|
Everod Samuel
Christopher DeRiggs
Phillip Baptiste
Hensley Baptiste
Curlan Gilchrist
Dwight Matthis
Donald Beggs

References

 The Grenada Boys' Secondary School and the Debate Over Secondary Education in Grenada, 1885-1946 by Edward L. Cox; accessed 10 June 2007

Schools in Grenada
Educational institutions established in 1885
1885 establishments in Grenada
Buildings and structures in St. George's, Grenada